Rise Me (stylized as Rise me) is the eighth studio album by Japanese singer Shizuka Kudo. It was released on April 1, 1993, through Pony Canyon. Rise Me is Kudo's last album to be produced by Tsugutoshi Gotō. It yielded Kudo's best-selling single, "Dōkoku".

Commercial performance
Rise Me debuted at number three on the Oricon Albums Chart, with 58,000 units sold in its first week. The album dropped four positions to number seven on its second week, with 41,000 copies sold. It stayed at number seven the following week, selling 24,000 copies. Rise Me charted in the top 100 for ten weeks, selling a reported total of 183,000 copies during its run. It ranked at number 99 on the year-end Oricon Albums Chart.

Track listing

Charts

Certification

Release history

References

1993 albums
Shizuka Kudo albums
Pony Canyon albums